Simpson Township may refer to:

Canada 

Simpson Township, a historic county in Algoma District, Ontario

United States 

Simpson Township, Grant County, Arkansas
Simpson Township, Johnson County, Missouri
Simpson Township, Dewey County, Oklahoma
Simpson Township, McIntosh County, Oklahoma

See also 

Simpson (disambiguation)

Township name disambiguation pages